Escápate conmigo (in English: Escape With Me) is a Mexican motion picture categorized as musical and comedy, released in 1988. Manuel Mijares has confessed that he fell in love with Lucero since they starred in this film, ten years later they got married .

Synopsis  

Lucerito (Lucero) is a teenager of 18 who lives in a gloomy castle that belongs to her aunt Raymunda (Ariadna Welter), her tutor and executor, too. Raymunda is very strict and scolds Lucerito as well as making life impossible for her. To top it off Raymunda wants to marry Lucerito to old crone Don Gastón (Alfredo Wally Barrón) forcefully. One day Lucerito watches on TV a contest, where the one to gives the prize of "Queen for A Day" is Manuel (Mijares), an old friend. She decides to sneak out and travels to Mexico City to participate in the contest; on this journey she meets several characters and experiences unexpected adventures .

Cast 
 Lucero as Lucerito
 Manuel Mijares as Manuel
 Jorge Ortiz de Pinedo as Sergio
 Pedro Weber 'Chatanuga' as Melolico
 Ariadna Welter as Raymunda
 Alejandro Guce as Augurio Aguado
 Alfredo Wally Barrón as Don Gastón Perales

Soundtrack
This is a special album by Lucero with 5 tracks.
 Un mundo mejor
 Refresco para dos
 Buen día
 Sueños
 Corazón aventurero

External links 
 

1988 films
Mexican musical comedy films
1980s Spanish-language films
1980s Mexican films